The 1890 Philadelphia Athletics had a 54–78 record and finished in eighth place in the American Association. During the season, the team struggled financially. They could not afford to keep paying their players and had to finish the season with a pickup team.

Summary
Led by pitcher Sadie McMahon (29–18 win–loss record) and third baseman Denny Lyons (193 OPS+), the Athletics started the season with a record of 41–21. At that point, on July 6, they were in first place by five games. However, the team was struggling financially, and then they also struggled on the field. They sold Lyons to the St. Louis Browns on September 6. After winning on September 14, they had a 54–56 record and were in sixth place out of nine teams, 15 games out of first. The Athletics lost their next game on September 16 right before leaving on a 16-game western road trip. By then, they were unable pay their players. That day, they released their starting catcher and only future Hall of Famer, Wilbert Robinson, who signed with the Baltimore Orioles two days later. Many of the Athletics' other players deserted the team. Among those who left were three regulars who never played in the major leagues again: right fielder Orator Shafer (113 OPS+) played his last game on September 13, and first baseman Jack O'Brien (126 OPS+) and left fielder Blondie Purcell (108 OPS+) both played their last game on September 16.

For the road trip, Athletics manager Bill Sharsig was sent off with $245 and what was left of the team. As writer David Nemec noted, "[Sharsig] then lived from hand to mouth by spending gate receipts from each series to pay his players and hotel bills and buy train tickets to the next city. By the end of the season he was reduced each day to putting a uniform on anyone who even looked like a ballplayer in order to field a full nine-man lineup." Among the "major league" players who appeared for the team in October were five people who are listed in the record books by just their last names, as their first names are unknown. The Athletics lost all 16 games on that road trip, and then they lost their last five games at home. Overall, they finished their season on a 22-game losing streak for a record of 54–78 and eighth place. Of those 22 losses, 13 of them were by at least 10 runs. They played the seventh-place Syracuse Stars in their last series of the season, and in three games, they were outscored by the Stars 43–7.

The Athletics were expelled from the American Association after the season ended. They were replaced by a new Philadelphia Athletics team that had been in the Players' League in 1890.

Regular season

Season standings

Record vs. opponents

Roster

Player stats

Batting

Starters by position 
Note: Pos = Position; G = Games played; AB = At bats; H = Hits; Avg. = Batting average; HR = Home runs; RBI = Runs batted in

Other batters 
Note: G = Games played; AB = At bats; H = Hits; Avg. = Batting average; HR = Home runs; RBI = Runs batted in

Pitching

Starting pitchers 
Note: G = Games pitched; IP = Innings pitched; W = Wins; L = Losses; ERA = Earned run average; SO = Strikeouts

Other pitchers 
Note: G = Games pitched; IP = Innings pitched; W = Wins; L = Losses; ERA = Earned run average; SO = Strikeouts

Relief pitchers 
Note: G = Games pitched; W = Wins; L = Losses; SV = Saves; ERA = Earned run average; SO = Strikeouts

References 

Philadelphia Athletics (AA) seasons
Philadelphia Athletics (AA) season
Philly